Jacob Mulder (born 11 August 1995) is an Irish cricketer. He made his Twenty20 International (T20I) debut against Hong Kong on 5 September 2016. He made his One Day International (ODI) debut against the United Arab Emirates on 4 March 2017. He made his first-class debut for Northern Knights in the 2017 Inter-Provincial Championship on 1 August 2017. In 2020, he finished his career playing in Ireland, before returning to Australia.

References

External links
 

1995 births
Living people
Irish cricketers
Ireland One Day International cricketers
Ireland Twenty20 International cricketers
Cricketers from Perth, Western Australia
Northern Knights cricketers